The largenose catshark (Apristurus nasutus) is a catshark of the family Scyliorhinidae. The largenose catshark is found on the upper continental slopes in the eastern Pacific, from the Gulf of Panama to Ecuador and central Chile, between 9°N and 28°S. It can grow up to 70 cm. Its reproduction is oviparous. This nose shark is considered to be a harmless species. It is known to originate from the Gulf of Panama, Ecuador, and Central Chile. 

This organism has a reported length of between 50-70 cm. This organism lives mostly on the Eastern Pacific Ocean. Though the biology on this species is not much known, this organism tends to stay together with the same organisms/traveling as a pack. These species are harmless to humans and are known as “oviparous breeding species”.
Parasites of the largenose catshark, studied off Chile, include Monogeneans, Cestodes, and Nematodes.

References

Further reading
 

largenose catshark
Western South American coastal fauna
Taxa named by Fernando de Buen y Lozano
largenose catshark